RLD may refer to:

 Red-light district
 Relocking device
 Robert Louis-Dreyfus (1946–2009), a Franco-Swiss businessman
 Rashtriya Lok Dal, an Indian political party
 Rossiyskoye Libertarianskoye Dvizhenie (The Russian Libertarian Movement)
 the IATA code of Richland Airport (Washington)
 RELOADED, a warez group
 Right Leg Driving technique, often used in biological signal amplifiers to reduce common-mode interference